Cassells may refer to:

 Cyrus Cassells (b. 1957), an American poet
 Ian Cassells, a Scottish author
 Keith Cassells (b. 1957), an English footballer 
 Thomas Cassells, a Scottish politician
 William Wharton Cassells (d.1925), Anglican missionary, one of the Cambridge Seven
 Cassell's National Library

See also
 Cassell (disambiguation)
 Cassels

Given names